Chaviano is a surname. Notable people with the surname include:

Daína Chaviano (born 1957), Cuban-American novelist
Francisco Chaviano, Cuban human rights activist and mathematics professor
Flores Chaviano (born 1946), Cuban composer, guitarist, professor, and orchestral conductor